Jenny Wake is a New Zealand actor and theatre director. In 1991 she founded Calico Young People's Theatre.

Biography 
Wake completed a master's degree in children’s theatre at Humboldt State University in California. She specialises in children's television and theatre productions and has worked on television series Play School and What Now.

In the late 1980s Wake worked at the Downstage Theatre in Wellington, New Zealand as the youth activities director, and in 1991 she founded a theatre company focused on youth, Calico Young People's Theatre. Wake has adapted stories for the stage, including Maurice Gee's The Halfmen of O and Hans Christian Andersen's The Snow Queen.

References 

Living people
New Zealand theatre directors
Year of birth missing (living people)